"Faithless Love" is a song written by J.D. Souther and first recorded and released by Linda Ronstadt on her 1974 album Heart Like a Wheel. Souther's recording appears on his 1976 album Black Rose.

American country music artist Glen Campbell's version of the song was released in June 1984 as the lead single from the album Letter to Home. The song reached #10 on the Billboard Hot Country Singles & Tracks chart.

Chart performance

References

1974 songs
1984 singles
Linda Ronstadt songs
J. D. Souther songs
Glen Campbell songs
Songs written by J. D. Souther
Song recordings produced by Harold Shedd
Atlantic Records singles
Song recordings produced by Peter Asher